KHSI may refer to:

 Hastings Municipal Airport (ICAO code KHSI)
 KHSI-LP, a low-power radio station (97.5 FM) licensed to serve Conrad, Montana, United States